Wang Ja-ji (1066 – 30 March 1122) was a Korean  politician, general, musician and ambassador during the Goryeo dynasty period. He fought deputies to general Yun Gwan and trained seventeen-thousand Jurchen soldiers from 1100 to 1108.

Life 
Wang Jha-ji was from Haeju in Hwanghaedo. His original family name was Bak, but his great-grandfather Bak Yu (박유) changed his surname from Bak to Wang..

Wang Ja-ji was from one country. Later he helped his brother-in-law Wang Gukmo (왕국모, 王國髦) in a military coup and the killing of Lee Jaui (이자의 李資義). He was appointed to Jeonjunggam.

During the reign of King Sukjong he was appointed  (내시 內侍, "secretary").). In 1108 he was appointed to Byeongmaban-gwan (병마판관, 兵馬判官) and entourage to General Yun Gwan.

He successively filled various government posts, including Jeonjungsogam (전중소감 殿中少監), Yebinsigyeong (예빈시경 禮賓侍卿), Chumilwonjijusa (추밀원지주사 樞密院知奏事).

In 1115 he was appointed to Ibusangseo and envoy to China's Song Dynasty. Thereafter in 1117 he was Jwasangisangsi (좌산기상시 左散騎常侍) and Chumilwondongjisa (추밀원동지사 樞密院同知事). In 1122 he was Ibusangseo (이부상서 吏部尙書), Chamjijungsa (참지정사 參知政事) and Hobupansa (호부판사 戶部判事). He died that year at age 56.

See also 
 Yun Gwan
 Kim Gu

Notes

References 
 Namgounchul, 《고려명신전》(김동주 역, 성남 문화원, 2004)

External links 
 Wang Jha-ji:Naver 
 Wang Jha-ji:Nate 
 Wang Jha-ji:britannica 
 왕자지:한국역대인물종합정보  

1066 births
1122 deaths
Korean admirals
Korean generals
Ambassadors of Korea
Military history of Korea
12th-century Korean people
11th-century Korean people
Korean musicians
People from Haeju